Puhinui railway station is a station of the Auckland rail network and is located in Papatoetoe, Auckland, New Zealand. Passenger services on the Eastern Line and Southern Line use the station. It is accessed from Puhinui Road from both sides of the tracks via a pedestrian bridge located at the site of a former level crossing (Puhinui Road itself now crosses on a bridge approximately 120m north of the pedestrian bridge). This is the nearest public transport access to the main cemetery for South Auckland; Manukau cemetery at 361 Puhinui Road, Wiri.

South of this station, Eastern Line and Southern Line services diverge, the Eastern onto the Manukau Branch which terminates at Manukau. The Southern continues south via Homai toward Papakura.

History

The station was opened on 29 June 1925 for passengers. Goods services closed on 12 May 1958. Originally, the name Cambria was suggested for the railway station.

Services

Auckland One Rail, on behalf of Auckland Transport, operates suburban services to Britomart, Manukau, Papakura and Pukekohe via Puhinui. The typical weekday off-peak timetable is:
6 trains per hour (tph) to Britomart, consisting of:
3 tph via Glen Innes (Eastern Line)
3 tph via Penrose and Newmarket (Southern Line)
3 tph to Manukau
3 tph to Papakura

Bus-rail interchange

An eastward line from the airport to Botany Downs has also been proposed with a new interchange at Puhinui railway station, planned to be built in two stages, the first of which is said to be an early deliverable component of the Airport to Botany rapid transit line. The redeveloped $69 million Puhinui Station interchange had a public open day on 24 July 2021, with train services resuming on 26 July 2021. This encompasses a new at-grade bus/rail interchange and enhanced station. Buses will still use the existing local road (Bridge Street) to cross the railway line to/from Manukau, along with local traffic.

The second phase provides a rapid transit overbridge across the railway line to provide a more direct and bespoke rapid transit connection. The new rapid transit link will integrate with the new interchange station on the overbridge. The first stage is estimated to cost $59 million to construct. The line will also go through Manukau railway station before ending in Botany.

See also 
 List of Auckland railway stations

References 

Rail transport in Auckland
Railway stations in New Zealand
Buildings and structures in Auckland
Railway stations opened in 1925
1925 establishments in New Zealand
Ōtara-Papatoetoe Local Board Area